Heavy Songs is a 2002 album by the Japanese rock group Shonen Knife.

Track listing
"A Map Master"
"AAA"
"Golden Years Of Rock'n Roll"
"Rubber Band"
"Heavy Song"
"A Boogie Monster"
"Mushroom Hair Cut"
"Whatever"
"Pigmy Jerboa"
"An Elephant Insect"
"Computer Language"
"Mango Juice (for George Harrison)"

Personnel
Naoko Yamano - guitar, vocals
Atsuko Yamano - bass, drums, backing vocals

References

Shonen Knife albums
2002 albums